Kruszewiec may refer to the following places:

Kruszewiec, Opoczno County in Łódź Voivodeship (central Poland)
Kruszewiec, Tomaszów Mazowiecki County in Łódź Voivodeship (central Poland)
Kruszewiec, Warmian-Masurian Voivodeship (north Poland)